Larmer is a surname. Notable people with the surname include:

James Larmer (1808 or 1809 – 1886), English-born surveyor of New South Wales
Jeff Larmer (born 1962), Canadian ice hockey player, brother of Steve
Steve Larmer (born 1961), Canadian ice hockey player

See also
Larmer Tree Gardens, garden in Wiltshire, England
Larmer Tree Festival, music and arts festival in England
Larmer Bay ruin, ruin in the British Virgin Islands